Agropyropsis is a monotypic genus of grasses closely related to Catapodium. It is native to the Batna Province in northeastern Algeria, and only contains a single species, Agropyropsis lolium. It once included a second species, Agropyropsis gracilis, which has since been renamed and moved to Lolium canariense.

References 

Pooideae
Endemic flora of Algeria
Grasses of Africa
Monotypic Poaceae genera
Taxa named by Benjamin Balansa
Taxa named by Ernest Cosson
Taxa named by Michel Charles Durieu de Maisonneuve
Taxa named by Aimée Antoinette Camus